Highway 276 (AR 276, Ark. 276, and Hwy. 276) is a designation for two state highways in Arkansas County, Arkansas. One route is a short industrial access road in south Stuttgart. A second route begins at US Highway 165 (US 165) at Lodge Corner and runs  to US 165/AR 1/AR 152 south of De Witt. A spur route, designated Highway 267S, runs south at Bayou Meto to connect to Highway 11. All three routes are maintained by the Arkansas Department of Transportation (ArDOT).

Route description

Stuttgart
Highway 276 begins at a county road intersection with Gregory Fisher Road and Lennox Road at the southern edge of Stuttgart. The highway runs north as Buerkle Street, named for George Adam Buerkle, the founder of Stuttgart. Highway 276 runs north as a section line road, passing an industrial facility, Stuttgart Junion High School, Stuttgart High School, and the school's athletic fields before an intersection with US 79B, where the route terminates. As of 2016, the route had an annual average daily traffic (AADT) of 2,700 vehicles per day (VPD).

Lodge Corner to Indiana
Highway 276 begins at US 165 at Lodge Corner on the Arkansas Grand Prairie. The route runs due south through Hagler to Bayou Meto, where Highway 276S begins southbound. Highway 276 runs due east as a section line road through agricultural areas. As the route approaches Mill Bayou, the highway passes hunting lodges for hunters seeking the waterfowl of the Mississippi Flyway. It passes a large rice mill before intersecting US 165/AR 1, a principal north–south highway in the region also designated as the Great River Road, a National Scenic Byway, and Highway 152.

History
Highway 276 was created by the Arkansas State Highway Commission (ASHC) on April 24, 1963 between Lodge Corner and Indiana. The spur route was created on June 23, 1965. The Stuttgart route was created October 23, 1974.

Major intersections
Mile markers reset at some concurrencies.

Bayou Meto spur

Highway 276Y Spur (AR 276S, Ark. 276S, Hwy. 276S) is a  spur route at Bayou Meto in southern Arkansas County. The route provides access to Highway 11. It was created by the ASHC on June 23, 1965.

Major intersections

See also

References

External links

276
Transportation in Arkansas County, Arkansas
State highway spurs in Arkansas